The 2001 Giro d'Italia was the 84th edition of the Giro d'Italia, one of cycling's Grand Tours. The Giro began in Montesilvano, with a Prologue individual time trial on 19 May, and Stage 11 occurred on 30 May with a stage from Bled, Slovenia. The race finished in Milan on 10 June.

Stage 11
30 May 2001 — Bled to Gorizia,

Stage 12
31 May 2001 — Gradisca d'Isonzo to Montebelluna,

Stage 13
1 June 2001 — Montebelluna to Passo Pordoi,

Stage 14
2 June 2001 — Cavalese to Arco,

Stage 15
3 June 2001 — Sirmione to Salò,  (ITT)

Stage 16
4 June 2001 — Erbusco to Parma,

Rest day
5 June 2001

Stage 17
6 June 2001 — Sanremo to Sanremo,

Stage 18
7 June 2001 — Imperia to Sant'Anna di Vinadio

The stage was cancelled, after a police raid uncovered widespread doping in the peloton.

Stage 19
8 June 2001 — Alba to Busto Arsizio,

Stage 20
9 June 2001 — Busto Arsizio to Arona,

Stage 21
10 June 2001 — Arona to Milan,

References

2001 Giro d'Italia
Giro d'Italia stages